Michael Arthur LeDonne (born October 26, 1956) is a jazz pianist and organist known for post-bop and hard bop. He has worked with Benny Golson since 1996 and performs under his own name all over the world.

Early life
LeDonne was born in Bridgeport, Connecticut, on October 26, 1956. His parents ran a music store. His father was a jazz guitarist, and LeDonne started performing locally around the age of ten. He also had lessons with John Mehegan for four years. After graduating from the New England Conservatory of Music where he studied with Jaki Byard in 1978, he moved to New York City and joined the Widespread Depression Jazz Orchestra.

Later life and career
LeDonne left the Widespread Depression Jazz Orchestra in 1981 and toured the UK with Panama Francis and the Savoy Sultans Back in New York, LeDonne became the house pianist at Jimmy Ryan's, where he played with some big names in jazz during 1981–83. He was also part of Benny Goodman's Sextet in 1982–83.

LeDonne joined Milt Jackson's quartet around 1987; he also composed for and recorded with the band and eventually became musical director. He stayed with this quartet until Jackson's death in 1999.  His first recording as a leader was in 1988. It was released by Criss Cross, and LeDonne went on to record several more albums for this label in the 1990s. "As a sideman he played in the Art Farmer–Clifford Jordan Quintet and toured Paris with Grady Tate (both 1988), performed with Charles McPherson (1992), James Moody (1992), Sonny Rollins (1995), and Benny Golson (late 1990s to the present), and served as an accompanist to Ernestine Anderson, Annie Ross and Mary Stallings." In 1998, LeDonne began recording for Double-Time Records. In 2000, LeDonne started his "Groover Quartet" (organ with guitar, drums and tenor sax) band as the result of a weekly Tuesday night gig at the Smoke Jazz Club in NYC. This brought his organ playing to prominence and the band went on to record many CD's for the Savant label as well as tour the world. He continues to split his time between the organ and the piano, releasing several #1 'jazz chart' recordings as well as winning the Downbeat Rising Star Poll and being nominated for Best Keyboards by the Jazz Journalist Association in 2012. As a sideman, he played organ  with Lou Donaldson, George Coleman and David "Fathead" Newman. In 2014 LeDonne revived the annual disability pride march in New York City.

Playing style
Grove wrote: "A level of understatement in LeDonne's style reflects the playing of Hank Jones and Tommy Flanagan. Predominantly a bop pianist, he introduces a strong left hand into his work and reveals an understanding of swing piano playing". Major influences also include  Wynton Kelly, Cedar Walton and McCoy Tyner. His Hammond Organ playing shows influences ranging from Jimmy Smith, Don Patterson and Charles Earland to Melvin Rhyne and Larry Young.

Discography

As leader/co-leader

As sideman
With Eric Alexander
Gentle Ballads (2004) Venus
The Battle (Live at Smoke) [with Vincent Herring] (2005) HighNote
Gentle Ballads II (2006) Venus
Gentle Ballads III (2007) Venus
Lazy Afternoon: Gentle Ballads IV (2008) Venus
Revival of the Fittest (2009) HighNote
Friendly Fire (Live at Smoke) [with Vincent Herring] (2011) HighNote
Live Encounter [New York All-Stars] (2018) Ubuntu Music

With Mike DiRubbo
Keep Steppin'  (2001) Criss Cross

With Chris Flory
For All We Know (1988) Concord
Word on the Street (1996) Double-Time
For You (2007) Arbors

With Benny Golson
Remembering Clifford (1998) Milestone
Brown Immortal (1997 [rel. 2000]) Keystone/Video Arts [Japan]
Terminal 1 (2004) Concord
New Time, New 'Tet (2009) Concord
Horizon Ahead (2016) HighNote

With Wycliffe Gordon
Boss Bones (2007) Criss Cross
Cone and T-Staff (2009) Criss Cross

With Scott Hamilton
Organic Duke (1994) Concord

With Michael Hashim
A Blue Streak (1991) Stash
Guys and Dolls (1992) Stash
Multi Coloured Blue [a tribute to Billy Strayhorn] (1998) Hep

With Milt Jackson
Sa Va Bella (For Lady Legends) (1997) Qwest/WB

With Clifford Jordan
The Mellow Side of Clifford Jordan (1989–1991 [rel. 1997]) Mapleshade

With Hendrik Meurkens
Cobb's Pocket [with Peter Bernstein, Jimmy Cobb] (2019) In+Out

With Alvin Queen
I Ain't Lookin' at You (2005) Enja
Mighty Long Way (2008) Enja

With Duke Robillard
Swing (1986 [rel. 1988]) Rounder

With Scott Robinson
Jazz Ambassador: Scott Robinson Plays the Compositions of Louis Armstrong (2004) Arbors
Forever Lasting: Scott Robinson Plays the Compositions of Thad Jones (2007) Arbors

With Jim Rotondi
Blues for Brother Ray [a tribute to Ray Charles] (2009) Posi-Tone

With Tad Shull
Deep Passion (1990) Criss Cross
In the Land of the Tenor (1991) Criss Cross

With Greg Skaff
Blues For Mr. T (2003) Khaeon [note: reissued in 2004 as Ellington Boulevard on Zoho]

With Gary Smulyan
Saxophone Mosaic (1993) Criss Cross
Gary Smulyan With Strings (1996) Criss Cross
The Real Deal (2002) Reservoir
More Treasures (2006) Reservoir
Smul's Paradise (2011) Capri

With Jim Snidero
Standards Plus (1997) Double-Time
 Tippin' (2007) Savant

With Benny Waters
Birdland Birthday: Live at 95 (1997) Enja

With Cory Weeds
Big Weeds (2008) Cellar Live
Up a Step: The Music of Hank Mobley (2012) Cellar Live
Condition Blue: The Music of Jackie McLean (2014) Cellar Live
Let's Groove: The Music of Earth Wind & Fire (2017) Cellar Live
O Sole Mio! Music From the Motherland (2019 [rel. 2021]) Cellar Live

With Laura Welland
Dissertations on the State of Bliss (2004) OA2/Origin

With Saori Yano
Sakura Stamp (2005) Columbia

References

External links
Smokejazz.com bio
Mike LeDonne's home page
In Conversation with Mike LeDonne by Tomas Peña (Jazz.com)

1956 births
Living people
American jazz pianists
American male pianists
Musicians from Bridgeport, Connecticut
20th-century American pianists
Jazz musicians from Connecticut
21st-century American pianists
20th-century American male musicians
21st-century American male musicians
American male jazz musicians
Widespread Depression Jazz Orchestra members
Double-Time Records artists
Criss Cross Jazz artists